Afro–Latin Americans or Black Latin Americans (sometimes Afro-Latinos) are Latin Americans of full or mainly sub-Saharan African ancestry.

The term Afro–Latin American is not widely used in Latin America outside academic circles. Normally Afro–Latin Americans are called Black (or) and are seen as part of the general Latin demographic, especially in countries where they have a considerable presence. Latin Americans of African ancestry may also be denoted by the prefix Afro- plus a specific nationality, such as Afro-Brazilian, Afro-Cuban or Afro-Haitian.

The accuracy of statistics reporting on Afro–Latin Americans has been questioned, especially where they are derived from census reports in which the subjects choose their own designation, because in various countries the concept of African ancestry is viewed with differing attitudes. Afro-Latinos comprise the majority of the African diaspora.

History 
In the 15th and 16th centuries, many people of African origin were brought to the Americas by the Spanish and Portuguese, while some arrived as part of exploratory groups. A notable example of the latter was the black conquistador Juan Garrido, who introduced wheat to Mexico. Pedro Alonso Niño, traditionally considered the first of many New World explorers of African descent, was a navigator in the 1492 Columbus expedition. Those who were directly from West Africa mostly arrived in Latin America as part of the Atlantic slave trade, as agricultural, domestic, and menial laborers and as mineworkers.  They were also employed in mapping and exploration (for example, Estevanico) and were even involved in conquest (for example, Juan Valiente.) The Caribbean and South America received 95 percent of the Africans arriving in the Americas with only 5 percent going to Northern America.

Countries with significant African, Mulatto, or Zambo populations today include Brazil (54 million, if including the pardo Brazilian population with Mulatto phenotype), Haiti (8.7 million), Dominican Republic (8.5 million), Cuba (7 million), Colombia (5 million), Venezuela (4 million), Puerto Rico (1.8 million), and Ecuador (1.1 million). 

Traditional terms for Afro–Latin Americans with their own developed culture include garífuna (in Nicaragua, Honduras, Guatemala, and Belize), cafuzo (in Brazil) and zambo in the Andes and Central America. Marabou is a term of Haitian origin denoting a Haitian of multiracial ethnicity.

The mix of these African cultures with the Spanish, Portuguese, French, and indigenous cultures of Latin America has produced many unique forms of language (e.g., Palenquero, Garífuna, and Creole), religions (e.g., Candomblé, Santería, and Vodou), music (e.g., kompa, salsa, Bachata, Punta, Palo de Mayo, plena, samba, merengue, cumbia) martial arts (capoeira) and dance (rumba, merengue).

As of 2015, Mexico and Chile are the only two Latin American countries yet to formally recognize their Afro–Latin American population in their constitutions. This is in contrast to countries like Brazil and Colombia that lay out the constitutional rights of their African-descendant population.

In May 2022, the Project on Ethnicity and Race in Latin America (PERLA) at Princeton University estimated that about 130 million people in Latin America are of African descent.

Racial and ethnic distinctions 
Terms used within Latin America used in reference to African heritage include mulato (African – white mixture), zambo/chino (indigenous – African mixture) and pardo (African – native – white mixture) and mestizo, which refers to an indigenous – European mixture in all cases except for in Venezuela, where it is used in place of "pardo". The term mestizaje refers to the intermixing or fusing of ethnicities, whether by mere custom or deliberate policy. In Latin America this happened extensively between all ethnic groups and cultures, but usually involved European men and indigenous and African women.

Representation in the media 
Afro–Latin Americans have limited media appearance; critics have accused the Latin American media of overlooking the African, indigenous and multiracial populations in favor of over-representation of often blond and blue/green-eyed white Latin Americans as they share features of typical Southern Europeans with some mestizo features to create a more distinct look often seen in popular telenovelas. According to May 2022 Pew Research survey, Afro-Latinos in the United States were about 3 times more likely than other Latino adults to report being unfairly stopped by police, about half of the Afro-Latinos interviewed were told to go back to their country, and a third of them were called offensive names.

South America

Argentina 

According to the Argentina national census of the year 2010, the total Argentine population is 40,117,096, from which 149,493 are of African ancestry.
Traditionally it has been argued that the black population in Argentina declined since the early 19th century to insignificance.  Many believe that the black population declined due to systematic efforts to reduce the black population in Argentina in order to mirror the racially homogeneous countries of Europe. However, the pilot census conducted in two neighborhoods of Argentina in 2006 on knowledge of ancestors from Sub-saharan Africa verified that 5% of the population knew of Black African ancestry, and another 20% thought that it was possible but were not sure. Given that European immigration accounted for more than half the growth of the Argentine population in 1960, some researchers argue that, rather than decrease, what occurred was a process of overlaying, creating the "invisibility" of the population of Afro-Argentines and their cultural roots.

Bolivia 

African descendants in Bolivia account for about 1% of the population. They were brought in during the Spanish colonial times and the majority live in the Yungas.

In 1544, the Spanish Conquistadors discovered the silver mines in a city now called Potosí, which is on the base of Cerro Rico. They began to enslave the natives as workers in the mines. However, the health of the natives working in the mines became very poor, so the Spanish began to bring in enslaved Sub-Saharan Africans to work in the mines. Slaves were brought as early as the 16th century in Bolivia to work in mines. In Potosí during the 17th century 30,000 Africans were brought to work in the mines from which the total population of Potosí which numbered around 200,000. Slaves were more expensive in Bolivia then other parts of the Spanish colonies costing upwards to 800 pesos. This was due to the fact that they had to be bought from slave ports in the coastal region of the Spanish empire and had to trek from cities like Cartagena, Montevideo, and Buenos Aires to Bolivia.

Brazil 

Around 7% of Brazil's 190 million people reported to the census as Black, and many more Brazilians have some degree of African descent.

Brazil experienced a long internal struggle over abolition of slavery and was the last Latin American country to do so. In 1850 it finally banned the importation of new slaves from overseas, after two decades since the first official attempts to outlaw the human traffic (in spite of illegal parties of Black African slaves that kept arriving until 1855). In 1864 Brazil emancipated the slaves, and on 28 September 1871, the Brazilian Congress approved the Rio Branco Law of Free Birth, which conditionally freed the children of slaves born from that day on. In 1887 army officers refused to order their troops to hunt runaway slaves, and in 1888 the Senate passed a law establishing immediate, unqualified emancipation. This law, known as Lei Áurea (Golden Law) was sanctioned by the regent Isabel, Princess Imperial of Brazil, daughter of the emperor Pedro II on 13 May 1888.

Preto and pardo are among five ethnic categories used by the Brazilian Institute of Geography and Statistics, along with branco ("white"), amarelo ("yellow", East Asian), and indígena (Native American). In 2010, 7.6% of the Brazilian population, some 15 million people, identified as preto, while 43% (86 million) identified as pardo. Brazilians have a complex classification system based on the prominence of skin and hair pigmentation, as well as other features associated with the concept of race (raça).

The Africans brought to Brazil belonged to two major groups: the West African and the Bantu people. The West Africans mostly belong to the Yoruba people, who became known as the "nagô". The word derives from ànàgó, a derogatory term used by the Dahomey to refer to Yoruba-speaking people. The Dahomey enslaved and sold large numbers of Yoruba, largely of Oyo heritage. Slaves descended from the Yoruba are strongly associated with the Candomblé religious tradition. Other slaves belonged to the Fon people and other neighboring ethnic groups.

Bantu people were mostly brought from present-day Angola and the Congo, most belonging to the Bakongo or Ambundu ethnic groups. Bantu slaves were also taken from the Shona kingdoms of Zimbabwe and coastal Mozambique. They were sent in large scale to Rio de Janeiro, Minas Gerais, and Northeastern Brazil.

Chile 

Chile enslaved about 6,000 Africans, about one-third of whom arrived before 1615; most were utilized in agriculture around Santiago. Today there are very few Afro-Chileans, at the most, fewer than 0.001% can be estimated from the 2006 population.

In 1984, a study called Sociogenetic Reference Framework for Public Health Studies in Chile, from the Revista de Pediatría de Chile determined an ancestry of 67.9% European, and 32.1% Native American. In 1994, a biological study determined that the Chilean composition was 64% European and 35% Amerindian. The recent study in the Candela Project establishes that the genetic composition of Chile is 52% of European origin, with 44% of the genome coming from Native Americans (Amerindians), and 4% coming from Africa, making Chile a primarily mestizo country with traces of African descent present in half of the population. Another genetic study conducted by the University of Brasilia in several American countries shows a similar genetic composition for Chile, with a European contribution of 51.6%, an Amerindian contribution of 42.1%, and an African contribution of 6.3%. In 2015 another study established genetic composition in 57% European, 38% Native American, and 2.5% African.

Colombia

Afro-Colombians make up 9.34% of the population, almost 4.7 million people, according to a projection of the National Administration Department of Statistics (DANE). most of whom are concentrated on the northwest Caribbean coast and the Pacific coast in such departments as Chocó, although considerable numbers are also in Cartagena, Barranquilla and San Andres Island.

Approximately 4.4 million Afro-Colombians actively recognize their own black ancestry as a result of inter-racial relations with white and indigenous Colombians. They have been historically absent from high level government positions. Many of their long-established settlements around the Pacific coast have remained underdeveloped. In Colombia's ongoing internal conflict, Afro-Colombians are both victims of violence or displacement and members of armed factions, such as the FARC and the AUC. Afro-Colombians have played a role in contributing to the development of certain aspects of Colombian culture. For example, several of Colombia's musical genres, such as Cumbia, have African origins or influences. Some Afro-Colombians have also been successful in sports such as Faustino Asprilla, Freddy Rincón or María Isabel Urrutia.

San Basilio de Palenque is a village in Colombia that is noted for maintaining many African traditions. It was declared a Masterpieces of the Oral and Intangible Heritage of Humanity by UNESCO in 2005. The residents of Palenque still speak Palenquero, a Spanish/African creole.

Ecuador 

In 2006, Ecuador had a population of 13,547,510. According to the latest data from CIA World Factbook, the ethnic groups represented in Ecuador include mestizo (mixed Amerindian and white; 71.9%), Montubio (7.4%), Amerindian (7%), white (6.1%), Afroecuadorian (4.3%), mulato (1.9%), and black (1%). The Afro-Ecuadorian culture is found in the northwest coastal region of Ecuador and make up the majority (70%) in the province of Esmeraldas and the Chota Valley in the Imbabura Province. They can be also found in Ecuador's two largest cities, Quito and Guayaquil. The best known cultural influence known outside Ecuador is a distinctive kind of marimba music. From the Chota Valley there is Bomba (Ecuador) music which is very different from marimba from Esmeraldas.

Paraguay 

Black Paraguayans are descended from enslaved West Africans brought to Paraguay beginning in the 16th century. They became a significant presence in the country, and made up 11% of the population in 1785. Most Afro-Paraguayans established communities in towns such as Areguá, Emboscada, and Guarambaré. Many achieved their freedom during the Spanish rule. In the capital Asunción, there is a community of 300 Afro-Paraguayan families in the Fernando de la Mora municipality.

Peru 

Afro-Peruvians made up 9% of the Peruvian population (2,850 million)

Over the course of the slave trade, approximately 95,000 slaves were brought into Peru, with the last group arriving in 1850. Today, Afro-Peruvians reside mainly on the central and south coasts. Afro-Peruvians can also be found in significant numbers on the northern coast. Recently, it has been verified that the community with the greatest concentration of Afro-Peruvians is Yapatera in Morropón (Piura), made up of around 7,000 farmers who are largely descended from African slaves of "Malagasy" (Madagascar) origin. They are referred to as "malgaches" or "mangaches".

Afro-Peruvian music and culture was popularized in the 1950s by the performer Nicomedes Santa Cruz. Since 2006, his birthday, 4 June, has been celebrated in Peru as a Day of Afro-Peruvian Culture. Another key figure in the revival of Afro-Peruvian music is Susana Baca. Afro-Peruvian music was actually well known in Peru since the 1600s but oppressed by the Peruvian elite, as was Andean religion and language. Afro-Peruvian culture has not only thrived but influenced all aspects of Peruvian culture despite lacking any acknowledgment from mainstream media or history.

Uruguay 

A 2009 DNA study in the American Journal of Human Biology showed the genetic composition of Uruguay as primarily European, with Native American ancestry ranging from one to 20 percent and sub-Saharan African "from seven to 15 percent (depending on region)". Enslaved Africans and their descendants figured prominently in the founding of Uruguay.

In the late 18th century, Montevideo became a major arrival port for slaves, most brought from Portuguese colonies of Africa and bound for the Spanish colonies of the New World, the mines of Peru and Bolivia, and the fields of Uruguay. In the 19th century, when Uruguay joined other colonies in fighting for independence from Spain, Uruguayan national hero Jose Artigas led an elite division of black troops against the colonists. One of his top advisors was Joaquín Lenzina, known as Ansina, a freed slave who composed musical odes about his commander's exploits and is regarded by Afro-Uruguayans as an unheralded father of the nation.

Venezuela 

Black Venezuelans are mostly descendants of enslaved Africans brought to Venezuela from the 17th to the 19th century to work the coffee and cocoa crops. Most Black Venezuelans live in the North-central region, in the coastal towns Barlovento, Northern Yaracuy, Carabobo and Aragua States, and Eastern Vargas State; but also in several towns and villages in areas in South Lake Maracaibo (Zulia State) and Northern Merida State in the Andes, among others. They have kept their traditions and culture alive, especially through music.

Venezuela is a very racially mixed nation, which makes it difficult to individually identify and/or distinguish their ethno-racial background with precision. Research in 2001 on genetic diversity by the Venezuelan Institute of Scientific Research (Instituto Venezolano de Investigaciones Científicas, IVIC) in which the population was compared to the historical patterns of the colonial castes. According to the last population census in Venezuela conducted by the National Institute Estadististica (INE), 2.8% of the country's population identifies as afrodescendientes of the national total, which is 181 157 result in the number of Venezuelans with African racial characteristics. However, most Venezuelans have some Sub-Saharan African heritage, even if they identify as white.

Afro-Venezuelans have stood out as sportsmen, many of them in the Major League Baseball and other sports (e.g. former NBA/Houston Rockets forward Carl Herrera), however, most of them do not describe themselves as Afro-Venezuelan, but as Latinos or Hispanics or simply Venezuelans. Afro-Venezuelans have also stood out in the arts, especially in music, for example: Magdalena Sánchez, Oscar D'León, Morella Muñoz, Allan Phillips, Pedro Eustache, Frank Quintero, and many others. Miss Venezuela 1998, Carolina Indriago, Miss Venezuela Universe 2006, Jictzad Viña, and Miss Venezuela World 2006, Susan Carrizo are mulatto.

Central America 

The Afro–Latin Americans of Central America come from the Caribbean coast. The countries of Belize, Guatemala, Honduras and Nicaragua, are of Garífuna, Afro-Caribbean and/or Mestizo heritage, as well as of Miskito heritage. Those of Costa Rica and Panama are mostly of Afro-Caribbean heritage. Many Afro-Caribbean islanders arrived in Panama to help build the Panama Canal and to Guatemala, Honduras, Nicaragua and Costa Rica to work in the banana and sugar-cane plantations.

Belize 
Belizean culture is a mix of African, European, and Mayan but only 21% of the population is considered to be of African descent. The main community of African descent are the Creoles and Garifuna concentrated from the Cayo District to the Belize District and Stann Creek District (Dangriga) on the Caribbean Sea. Belize City, on the Caribbean coast, is the center of West African culture in Belize, with its population being of mixed Black African, Maya, and European.

Costa Rica 

About 8% of the population is of African descent or Mulatto (mix of European and African) who are called Afro-Costa Ricans representing more than 390,000 people spread nowadays all over the country, English-speaking descendants of 19th century Afro-Jamaican immigrant workers. The indigenous population numbers around 2.5%. In the Guanacaste Province, a significant portion of the population descends from a mix of local Amerindians, Africans and Spaniards. Most Afro-Costa Ricans are found in the Limón Province and the Central Valley.

El Salvador 

Only 0.13% of the population identifies as black in El Salvador. Approximately 10,000 African slaves were brought to El Salvador. The African population, creating Afro-Mestizos in the certain areas where the Africans were brought. El Salvador has no English Antillean (West Indian), Garifuna, and Miskito population, largely due to laws banning the immigration of Africans into the country in the 1930s; these laws were revoked in the 1980s.

Guatemala 

According to the 2018 census, 0.3% of the Guatemalan population identifies as having African ancestry. The main community of African heritage is the Garifuna, concentrated in Livingston and Puerto Barrios. The rest are Afro-Caribbean and mulattoes who live in Puerto Barrios and Morales. All these places belong to the Izabal department, located on the Caribbean coast. Because of unemployment and lack of opportunities, many Garifuna from Guatemala have left the country and moved to Belize and the United States. Also many people of African descent are located in different regions of the country, but most notable are in Amatitlán, San Jerónimo, and Jutiapa, although most of them may not recognize it because the loss of culture in these places. Based on oral local history in San Jeronimo of Alta Vera Paz, it is told that a ship carrying enslaved people from Africa broke on the shores of Guatemala prior to the European invasion. The ship had broken on the shores and the enslaved people became free people with the enslavers dead. The oral history continues to claim that the name Alta Verapaz – the land of " High True Peace" was given to that territory by the Spaniards after conquering the people of African and Mayan descent through religion – the cross – and not the sword as in other parts of Guatemala. The reason is Africans and Mayans had joined forces and defeated the Spanish Sword. Africans and Mayans have also intermarried tracing back generations prior to the Garifuna along the Coast. Many more Africans joined VeraPaz once the Spaniards conquered the area through religion, bringing about large sugar cane plantations that required more laborers, and unfortunately enslaved peoples.

Many of the slaves brought from Africa during colonial times came to Guatemala to work on cotton, sugar cane, tobacco, and coffee plantations. Most were brought as slaves and also servants by European conquistadors. The main reason for slavery in Guatemala was because of the large sugar-cane plantations and haciendas located on Guatemala's Pacific and Caribbean coasts. Slavery didn't last too long during those times and all slaves and servants brought were later freed. They spread to different locations, primarily Guatemala's north, south and east. It is said that these freed slaves later mixed with Europeans, Native Indigenous, and Creoles (Criollos) of non-African descent.

The national folk instrument, the marimba, has its origins in Africa and was brought to Guatemala and the rest of Central America by African slaves during colonial times. The melodies played on it show Native American, West African and European influences in both form and style.

Honduras 

According to Henry Gates:  "Estimates of people of African descent in Honduras vary widely, from 100,000 to 320,000 (1.8 to 5.8 percent of the country's 5.8 million people in 1994)."

If one uses the blood quantum definition of blackness, then blacks came to Honduras early in the colonial period. One of the mercenaries who aided Pedro de Alvarado in his conquest of Honduras in 1536 was a black slave working as a mercenary to earn his freedom. Alvarado sent his own slaves from Guatemala to work the placer gold deposits in western Honduras as early as 1534. The earliest black slaves consigned to Honduras were part of a license granted to the Bishop Cristóbal de Pedraza in 1547 to bring 300 slaves into Honduras. Honduras has the highest African ancestry in Central America from the Garifuna, Miskitos, Mulattoes, and Africans which make 30% of the country.

The self-identifying black population in Honduras is mostly of West Indian (Antillean origin), descendants of indentured laborers brought from Jamaica, Haiti, and other Caribbean Islands or of Garifuna (or Black Caribs) origin, a people of Black African ancestry who were expelled from the island of Saint Vincent after an uprising against the English and in 1797 and were exiled to Roatan. From there they made their way along the Caribbean coast of Belize, mainland Honduras and Nicaragua. Large Garifuna settlements in Honduras today include Trujillo, La Ceiba, and Triunfo de la Cruz. Even though they only came to Honduras in 1797, the Garifuna are one of the seven officially recognized indigenous groups in Honduras.

Slaves on the north coast mixed with the Miskito Indians, forming a group referred to as the Zambo Miskito. Some Miskito consider themselves to be purely indigenous, denying this Black African heritage. They do not, however, identify as such but rather as mestizo. The Black Creoles of the Bay Islands are today distinguished as an ethnic group for their racial difference from the mestizos and blacks, and their cultural difference as English-speaking Protestants.There has been practically
no ethnographic research conducted with this population.

All these circumstances led to a denial by many Hondurans of their Black African heritage which reflects in the census even to this day. "Blacks were more problematic as national symbols because at the time they were neither seen to represent modernity nor autochthony, and their history of dislocation from Africa means they have no great pre-Columbian civilization in the Americas to call upon as symbols of a glorious past. Thus Latin American states often end up with a primarily "Indo-Hispanic" mestizaje where the Indian is privileged as the roots of the nation and blackness is either minimized or completely erased."

Nicaragua 

About 9% of Nicaragua's population is African and mainly reside on the country's sparsely populated Caribbean coast. Afro-Nicaraguans are found on the autonomous regions of RAAN and RAAS. The African population is mostly of West Indian (Antillean) origin, the descendants of laborers brought mostly from Jamaica and other Caribbean islands when the region was a British protectorate. There is also a smaller number of Garífuna, a people of mixed Carib, Angolan, Congolese and Arawak descent. The Garífuna live along in Orinoco, La Fe and Marshall Point, communities settled at Laguna de Perlas.

Five main distinct ethnic groups exist: The Creoles who descend from Anglo-Caribbean countries and many of whom still speak Nicaragua English Creole, the Miskito Sambus descendants of Spanish slaves and indigenous Central Americans who still speak Miskito and/or Miskito Coast Creole, the Garifunas descendents of Zambos (Caribs, Arawaks, and shipwrecked maroons) expelled from St. Vincent who speak Garifuna, the Rama Cay zambos a subset of the Miskito who speak Rama Cay Creole, and the descendants of those enslaved by the Spanish.

Panama 

Black people in Panama are the descendants of West African slaves as well as black people from Caribbean islands who arrived in the early 1900s  for the construction of the Panama Canal. The Afro Colonials are the group of Hispanics, while the Antillanos are those of West Indian descent.

Famous Afro-Panamanians include boxer Eusebio Pedroza.

Caribbean

Cuba 

According to a 2001 national census which surveyed 11.2 million Cubans, 1.1 million Cubans described themselves as Black, while 5.8 million considered themselves to be "mulatto" or "mestizo" or "javao" or "moro". Many Cubans still locate their origins in specific African ethnic groups or regions, particularly Yoruba, Congo and Igbo, but also Arará, Carabalí, Mandingo, Fula and others, as well as a small minority of people who migrated in from surrounding Caribbean countries like Haiti and Jamaica.

An autosomal study from 2014 has found out the genetic ancestry in Cuba to be 72% European, 20% African and 8% Native American.

Among the most famous Afro-Cubans are writers Nicolás Guillén, Gastón Baquero, and Nancy Morejón; musicians Celia Cruz and Benny Moré— Compay Segundo, Rubén González, Orlando "Cachaito" López, Omara Portuondo, and Ibrahim Ferrer of the Buena Vista Social Club; jazz musicians including Mario Bauzá, Mongo Santamaría, Chucho Valdés, Gonzalo Rubalcaba, Anga Díaz, X Alfonso, Pablo Milanés; other musicians such as Bebo Valdés, Israel "Cachao" López, Orestes López, Richard Egües, Dámaso Pérez Prado, Christina Milian and Tata Güines; and politicians Juan Almeida and Esteban Lazo.

Dominican Republic 

According to the recent sources, 11% of the Dominican population is black, 16% is white and 73% is mixed from white European and black African and Native American ancestry. Other sources give similar figures, but also without naming a specific study. Other estimates puts the Dominican population at 90% Black and Mulatto, and 10% White.

Some Afrocentric commentators and race/ethnicity scholars have been harshly critical of Dominicans of mixed racial background for their reluctance to self-identify as "Black". However, this reluctance is shared by many people of multiracial background, who find inappropriate to identify with only one side of their ancestry. Those people refuse to express a preference for any of the races that make up their background, and resent being ascribed to any single race.

Dominican culture is a mixture of Taino Amerindian, Spanish European, and West African origins. While Taino influences are present in many Dominican traditions, the European and West African influences are the most noticeable.

Afro-Dominicans can be found all over the island, but they makeup the vast majorities in the southwest, south, east, and the north parts of the country. In El Cibao one can find people of either European, Mixed, and African descent.

Most Afro-Dominicans descend from the Bantu tribes of the Congo region of Central Africa (Angola, Democratic Republic of the Congo and Republic of Congo), and as well as the Ga people of west Ghana.

Notable Dominicans whose physical features suggest full or predominant Black African ancestry include bachata singer Antony Santos, baseballer Sammy Sosa and salsa singer José Alberto "El Canario", and basketballer Al Horford, among others. However, there is no reliable procedure to ascertain the degree, if any, to which their ancestry is Black African.

A system of racial stratification was imposed on Santo Domingo by Spain, as elsewhere in the Spanish Empire.

Guadeloupe 

The population of Guadeloupe, an overseas region of France, is 405,739 (1 January 2013 est.); 80% of the population has African and African-white-Indian mixture which emphasizes its diversity. Their West African ancestors were imported from the Bight of Biafra, West Central Africa and the Guinean Coast for sugar cane plantation labor during the 17th and 18th centuries.

Antillean Creole, which is a French-based creole, is the local language widely spoken among the natives of the island and even the immigrants who have been living on the island for a couple of years. French, the official language, is still the most common language used and heard on the island. Used during more intimate/friendly conversations, Guadeloupean people switch to French, which is their first and native language, when in public.

Haiti 

The population of Haiti is 9.9 million, of which 80% are of African descent while 15-20% is mulatto and white. Slavery in Haiti was established by the Spanish and French colonialists. Many Haitians are descendants of Taino or Caribs who cohabited with the African descendant population.

Haiti is an Afro-Latin nation with strong African contributions to the culture as well as its language, music and religion with a fusion of French and Taino, with a sizable degree of Spaniard; all relate and are not limited to its food, art, music, folk religion and other customs. Arab customs are also present in their society today.

Martinique 

The population of Martinique, an overseas region of France, is 390,371 (1 January 2012 est.); 80% of the population has African and African-white-Indian mixture which emphasizes its diversity. Their West African ancestors were imported from the Bight of Biafra, West Central Africa and the Guinean Coast for sugar cane plantation labor during the 17th and 18th centuries.

Antillean Creole, which is a French-based creole, is the local language widely spoken among the natives of the island and even the immigrants who have been living on the island for a couple of years. However, French, the official language, is still the most common language used and heard on the island. Used during more intimate/friendly conversations, Martinican people switch to French, which is their first and native language, when in public.

Puerto Rico 

According to the 2020 U.S. Census taken in Puerto Rico, 17.1% of Puerto Ricans identified as being white, 7% of the population as being black or African American and 75.3% as mixed or of another ethnicity. An island-wide mitochondrial DNA (mtDNA) study conducted by the University of Puerto Rico at Mayagüez revealed that 61% of Puerto Ricans have maternal Native American ancestry, 26.4% have maternal West or Central African ancestry, and 12.6% have maternal European ancestry. On the other hand, the Y chromosome evidence showed Puerto Ricans' patrilineage to be approximately 75% European, 20% African, and less than 5% indigenous.

An interesting anecdote to consider was that during this whole period, Puerto Rico had laws like the Regla del Sacar or Gracias al Sacar by which a person of African ancestry could be considered legally white so long as they could prove that at least one person per generation in the last four generations had also been legally white descent. Therefore, people of African ancestry with known European lineage were classified as "whites", the opposite of the "one-drop rule" in the United States.

These critics maintain that a majority of Puerto Ricans are ethnically mixed, but do not feel the need to identify as such. They argue, furthermore, that Puerto Ricans tend to assume that they are of African, Native American, and European ancestry and only identify themselves as "mixed" if parents visibly "appear" to be of some other ethnicity. It should also be noted that Puerto Rico underwent a "whitening" process while under U.S. rule. The census-takers at the turn of the 20th Century recorded a huge disparity in the number of "black" and "white" Puerto Ricans (both, erroneous skin classifications) between the 1910 and 1920 censuses. The term "black" suddenly began to disappear from one census to another (within 10 years' time), possibly due to redefinition. It also appears that the "black" element within the culture was simply disappearing possibly due to the popular idea that in the U.S. one could only advance economically and socially if one were to pass for "white".

Misinformation of ethnic populations within Puerto Rico also existed under Spanish rule, when the Native American (Taino) populations were recorded as being "extinct".  Biological science has now rewritten their history books. These tribes were not voluntary travelers, but have since blended into the mainstream Puerto Rican population (as all the others have been) with Taino ancestry being the common thread that binds.

Many persons of African descent in Puerto Rico are found along coastal areas, especially in the northeast of the island, areas traditionally associated with sugar cane plantations. These Afro-Puerto Ricans make up a significant percentage of the population especially in the cities and towns of San Juan, Loiza, Carolina, Patillas, Canóvanas, Maunabo, Río Grande, Culebra, Luquillo, Cataño, Ceiba, Juncos, Fajardo, and Guayama. African ancestry, and Puerto Ricans of notable African descent are found throughout the island, although they might not regularly associate themselves with an American concept of blackness. Due to the DNA evidence that is being presented by UPR at Mayaguez, many African bloodlines have also been recorded in the central mountains of the island, though not written in the Spanish history books of the time.  Consequently, Taino bloodlines have begun appearing in the coastal towns.  All of this suggests that escaped enslaved Africans ran off to the mountains to escape the slaveowners, while some Tainos remained close to their main staple food, fish. 

The Puerto Rican musical genres of bomba and plena are of West African and Caribbean origin, respectively; they are danced to during parties and West African-derived festivals. Most Puerto Ricans who have African ancestry are descendants of enslaved Congo, Yoruba, Igbo and Fon from West and Central Africa. After the abolition of slavery in 1873 and the Spanish–American War of 1898, a number of African Americans have also migrated and settled in Puerto Rico.

Three of the most famous Afro–Latin Americans are Puerto Rican Boxer Felix "Tito" Trinidad, Hall of Fame baseball player Roberto Clemente and Bernie Williams-Figueroa Jr., New York Yankees outfielder and jazz guitarist.

North America

Mexico 

The vast majority of contemporary Afro-Mexicans inhabit the southern region of Mexico; those who migrated north in the colonial period assimilated into the general population, making their existence in the country less evident than other groups. Some Afro-Mexican facts:
 Mexico's second president, Vicente Guerrero, an Afro-Mexican, issued an official decree abolishing slavery and emancipating all slaves in 1821, during his short term as president. He also attempted to change the Official Census by aiming to get rid of the "race" category. 
 Race was considered for the first time by the Encuesto Intercensal in 2015, which revealed that 1.2% of Mexicans identify as Afro-Mexican. Over half of these individuals also identified as indigenous.
 Gaspar Yanga founded the first free African township in the Americas in 1609.
 A Black man named Esteban el Negro (Steven the Black), a North African Moor from Spain, searched for the fabled city of Cíbola with Cabeza de Vaca.
 Veracruz, Campeche, Pánuco and Acapulco were the main ports for the entrance of African slaves.
 In the past, offspring of Black African/Amerindian mixtures were called jarocho (wild pig), chino or lobo (wolf). Today jarocho refers to all inhabitants of the state of Veracruz, without regard to ancestry.

United States 

Many Afro-Latino immigrants have arrived, in waves, over decades, to the United States, especially from the Caribbean, Cuba, Haiti, Dominican Republic and Puerto Rico. In the state of California, the dominant population consisted of people of color but as the years progressed the percentage has declined severely or at least the way Californian residents claim to identify themselves has shifted towards a White population. A Pew Research Center survey of Latino adults shows that one-quarter of all U.S. Latinos self-identify as Afro-Latino, Afro-Caribbean or of African descent with roots in Latin America. This is the first time a nationally representative survey in the U.S. has asked the Latino population directly whether they considered themselves Afro-Latino. According to another Pew Research Center survey, "Afro-Latino: A deeply rooted identity among U.S. Hispanics"  show some more statistics on how afro-Latinos identify. As of October 2014, 39% of U.S. afro-Latinos identify as white, 24% of them identify as just Hispanic, 18% as Black, 9% as mixed, and 4% as American Indian. Among the Chicano/a population, people who are both Black and Chicano/a may identify as AfroChicano/a. A May 2022 Pew Research Center survey stated that 12% of adult Latinos identified themselves as Afro-Latino, comprising an estimated total of six million people.

Afro-Latino populations in the Americas 

* Total population includes those who self-identify as black on census documents. Mixed populations in the Spanish Caribbean and Brazil have large numbers of people with African blood ranging from as low as 5-10%.

Noted Afro–Latin American people 

 Amara La Negra- Dominican singer, reality star and activist
 Anténor Firmin – Haitian anthropologist, journalist, and politician
 Lt. General José Antonio de la Caridad Maceo y Grajales – second-in-command of the Cuban Army of Independence
 Brian Flores- Honduran American Football coach for the Miami Dolphins in the NFL.
 Celia Cruz – Cuban singer of Latin music
 Christina Milian – Cuban-American singer, songwriter, and actress
 Clara Nunes – Brazilian singer
 Dania Ramirez – Dominican-American actress
 Dascha Polanco – Dominican actress
 David Green - AfroNicaraguan-born American MLB Player
 David Ortiz – Dominican-American former MLB player for the Boston Red Sox and the Minnesota Twins
 Dianne Morales (born 1967) – American non-profit executive and political candidate
 Edwidge Danticat- award-winning Haitian American novelist
 Gilberto Gil – Brazilian singer and politician
 Gina Torres – Cuban-American actress.
 Hanna Gabriel – Costa Rican junior middleweight boxer with several international victories
 Immortal Technique – Peruvian American Afro-Peruvian rapper & activist.
 Jean-Michel Basquiat- Haitian American artist
 Johnny Laboriel – Mexican singer
 José María Morelos – Mexican Roman Catholic priest and revolutionary rebel leader in the Mexican War of Independence
 Juan Gualberto Gómez – Afro-Cuban revolutionary leader in the Cuban War of Independence against Spain
 Julio Teherán (born 1991) – MLB baseball player
 June Beer - AfroNicaraguan artist and poet.
 Kalimba Marichal – Mexican singer/songwriter
 Machado de Assis – Brazilian novelist, poet, playwright and short story writer
 Maria Bethânia – Brazilian MPB singer
 María del Tránsito Sorroza – Afro-Ecuadorian midwife and formerly enslaved woman.
 Saint Martin de Porres, O.P. – Peruvian lay brother of the Dominican Order, beatified and later canonized
 Mellow Man Ace – Afro-Cuban American Rapper
 Margareth Menezes – Brazilian singer from Salvador, Bahia
 Nilo Peçanha – Brazilian politician, Governor of Rio de Janeiro State, Vice-president of Brazil then President of Brazil
 Oscar D'Leon – Venezuelan musician of salsa music
 Pedro A. Campos – Puerto Rican attorney, politician, and leading figure in the Puerto Rican independence movement
 Pelé (born 1940) – Brazilian professional footballer who played as a forward
 Raúl Cuero – Colombian professor of microbiology
 Ronaldinho – Brazilian professional footballer who played as a midfielder and as a forward
 Rosario Dawson – American actress, of Afro-Cuban heritage
 Rubén Rada – Afro-Uruguayan percussionist, composer and singer
 Selenis Leyva – Cuban-American actress
 Susana Baca – Peruvian singer-songwriter, teacher, folklorist, ethnomusicologist and Latin Grammy Award winner
 Vicente Guerrero – leading revolutionary general of the Mexican War of Independence who later served as President of Mexico
 Wifredo Lam – Cuban artist who sought to portray and revive the Afro-Cuban spirit and culture
 Yasiel Puig – Cuban-born American MLB baseball player
 Zoe Saldana – American Actress

See also 

 Africa Now!
 African Americans
 African diaspora
 African diaspora in the Americas
 Afro-Argentines
 Afro-Arubans
 Afro-Bolivians
 Afro-Brazilians
 Afro-Caribbean people
 Afro-Chileans
 Afro-Colombians
 Afro–Costa Ricans
 Afro-Cubans
 Afro-Curaçaoans
 Afro-Dominicans
 Afro-Dominicans (Dominica)
 Afro-Ecuadorians
 Afro-Guatemalans
 Afro-Haitians
 Afro-Hondurans
 Afro-Mexicans
 Afro-Nicaraguans
 Afro-Panamanians
 Afro-Paraguayans
 Afro–Puerto Ricans
 Afro-Salvadorans
 Afro-Spaniards
 Afro-Uruguayans
 Afro-Venezuelans
 Asian Latin Americans
 Atlantic Creole
 Black Hispanic and Latino Americans
 Black ladino
 Black Peruvians
 Creoles
 Demographics of Africa
 Cape Verdean
 Fernandino peoples
 Latin Americans
 List of Afro-Latinos
 List of topics related to the African diaspora
 Maroons
 Miskito
 Mulatto
 Négritude
 São Tomé and Príncipe
 Spanish immigration to Equatorial Guinea
 White Latin Americans
 Zambo

Notes

References

External links
 Oro Negro (Afrodescendants Foundation in Chile)
 Virginia Rioseco, "Oro Negro Foundation: Afro descendants organize themselves," Nuestro.cl (Chilean Cultural Heritage Site).
 Black Latin America

 
Ethnic groups in Central America
Ethnic groups in Latin America
Ethnic groups in North America
Ethnic groups in South America
Ethnic groups in the Caribbean